The Santa Monica Mountains, one of the Transverse Ranges located in Southern California, are in the California chaparral and woodlands ecoregion of the California Floristic Province. This ecoregion has two predominant ecosystems, with three primary plant communities: 
 the California coastal sage and chaparral, with coastal sage scrub along the coast,
 the California montane chaparral and woodlands, with chaparral and California oak woodlands as the mountains rise and recede from the coast and descend into the interior valleys.

Introduction
The Santa Monica Mountains are covered by hundreds of local plant species: some are endemic or very rare, some are beautiful California native plants in situ, and some also are familiar as horticultural ornamental and native garden plants. Each season has different plants predominating the visual experience.

A partial list of Plants seen in the Santa Monica Mountains:

Native and non-native flora

Monocotyledons
					

 Agavaceae
Hesperoyucca whipplei (aka: Yucca whipplei) (Chaparral Yucca, Our Lord's Candle, Spanish Bayonet)  
 AmaryllidaceaeAllium peninsulareBloomeria croceaDipterostemon capitatus (Blue Dicks)
 Cyperaceae
 Carex senta Carex spp.
 Iridaceae
  Sisyrinchium bellum (Blue Eyed Grass)
 Juncaceae
 Juncus patens (Gray Spike Rush)
 Juncus spp.

 LiliaceaeCalochortus splendens (Calochortus) Calochortus venustusCalochortus spp.Chlorogalum pomeridianum (Soap Plant) Fritillaria biflora Lilium humboldtii (Humboldt's Lily)
 Orchidaceae
 Epipactis gigantea (Stream Orchid)
 Poaceae alt. Gramineae
 Festuca californica (California fescue)
 Leymus condensatus (aka: Eleymus condensatus) (Giant Wild Rye grass) 
 Leymus triticoides (Creeping Wild Rye)
 Melica californica (California Melic Grass)
 Melica imperfecta (Little California Melic Grass)
 Nassella pulchra (aka: Stipa pulchra) (Purple Needlegrass)-California State Grass

Dicotyledons
					

 Aizoaceae
(Ice Plant)
Carpobrotus edulis
Mesembryanthemum crystallinum
 Anacardiaceae (Sumac)
Malosma laurina (Laurel Sumac)
Rhus integrifolia (Lemonadeberry)
Rhus ovata (Sugar Bush)
Rhus trilobata (Squaw Bush) 
 Toxicodendron diversilobum (Poison Oak) (skin irritation) 
 Apiaceae (Umbel flowers, Carrots)
 Conium maculatum (Poison Hemlock) (poisonous)
 Foeniculum vulgare (Sweet Fennel)
 Asteraceae
(Yarrow)
 Artemisia californica (California sagebrush) 
 Baccharis glutinosa (Mule fat)
 Baccharis pilularis (Coyote Brush)
 Centaurea melitensis (Yellow Star Thistle) (significant invasive exotic)
 Cirsium occidentale
 Encelia californica
 Eriophyllum confertiflorum
 Gnaphalium californicum
  Malacothrix saxatilis (Cliff Aster)
 Silybum marianum
Misc (sunfowers)
 Boraginaceae
 Brassicaceae
 Brassica nigra  (Black Mustard) (invasive exotic)
 Stanleya pinnata Cactaceae
 Opuntia littoralis  Capparaceae
 Isomeris arborea  Sambucus mexicana  (Mexican Elderberry)
 Caryophyllaceae
 Silene laciniata Chenopodiaceae
 Salsola iberica (Tumbleweed)
 Cistaceae
 Cistus villosus  Helianthemum scoparium Convolvulaceae
 Calystegia macrostegia (Morning glory)
 Cuscuta californica  (Dodder, Orangebeard, Witches Hair)
 Crassulaceae
 Dudleya lanceolata  Dudleya pulverulenta" (Chalk Dudleya) 
 Cucurbitaceae
 Cucurbita foetidissima 
 Marah macrocarpus 
 Ericaceae (Heath family)
 Arctostaphylos glandulosa 
 Euphorbiaceae
 Euphorbia albomarginata 
 Ricinus communis 
 Fabaceae (Leguminosae, Pea family)
 Lotus scoparius (Broom)
 Lupinus spp.
 Lupinus hirsutissimus 
 Medicago sativa 
 Pickeringia montana 
 Spartium junceum 
 Gentianaceae
 Centaurium venustum 
 Geraniaceae
 Erodium cicutarium 
 Hydrophyllaceae
 Eriodictyon crassifolium  (Yerba Santa)
 Phacelia cicutaria  (Caterpillar phacelia)
 Phacelia grandiflora 
 Phacelia parryi 
 Lamiaceae (Mint)
 Marrubium vulgare  (Horehound)
 Salvia apiana  (White Sage)
 Salvia clevelandii - (Cleveland sage)
 Salvia columbariae  (Chia)
 Salvia leucophylla  (Purple sage)
 Salvia mellifera  (Black sage)
 Malvaceae
 Malacothamnus fasciculatus 
  Malva parviflora  (Cheeseweed)

 Nyctaginaceae
 Abronia umbellata  (Verbena)
 Mirabilis californica  (Wishbone Plant)
 Onagraceae
 Clarkia deflexa 
 Clarkia unguiculata 
 Zauschneria californica  - (California Fuchsia)
 Oxalidaceae
  Oxalis pes-caprae  
 Paeoniaceae
 Paeonia californica 
 Papaveraceae
 Dendromecon rigida  - (Bush Poppy)
 Dicentra ochroleuca 
 Eschscholzia californica  - (California Poppy)
 Papaver californicum 
 Romneya coulteri  - (Matilija Poppy)
 Polemonacea
 Leptodactylon californicum
 Linanthus dianthiflorus
 Polygonaceae
 Eriogonum crocatum - (Conejo Buckwheat)  (endemic)
 Eriogonum cinereum -  (Coastal Buckwheat)  (endemic)
 Eriogonum elongatum
 Eriogonum fasciculatum - (California buckwheat)
 Rumex crispus
 Portulacaceae
 Claytonia perfoliata 
 Primulaceae
 Anagalis arvensis 
 Dodecatheon clevelandii 
 Ranunculaceae
 Clematis ligusticifolia 
 Delphinium cardinale:
 Delphinium parryi 
 Ranunculus californicus 
 Rhamnaceae
 Ceanothus crassifolius 
 Ceanothus cuneatus 
 Ceanothus leucodermis 
 Ceanothus megacarpus  - (Bigpod Ceanothus)  (endemic)
 Ceanothus oliganthus 
 Ceanothus spinosus 
 Rhamnus californica  - (Coffeeberry)
 Rosaceae
 Adenostoma fasciculatum  - (Coastal Sage)
 Cercocarpus betuloides  - (Mountain Mahogany)
 Heteromeles arbutifolia  - (Toyon)
 Prunus ilicifolia  - (Evergreen Cherry)
 Rosa californica 
 Rubus ursinus  - (California Blackberry)
 Salicaceae
 Salix lasiolepis - (Arroyo Willow)
 Saxifragaceae
 Ribes amarum - (Bitter Gooseberry) (endemic)
 Ribes aureum  - (Golden Currant)
 Ribes divaricatum - (Parish's Gooseberry)
 Ribes malvaceum - (Chaparral Currant)
 Ribes speciosum  - (Fuchsia-flowered Gooseberry)
 Scrophulariaceae (Figwort family)
 Anirrhinum coulterianum 
Antirrhinim kelloggii 
 Castilleja affins 
 Casrilleja foliolosa 
 Castilleja marinii 
 Mimulus brevipes 
 Mimulus aurantiacus 
 Mimulus cardinalis 
 Mimulus guttatus 
 Mimulus longiflorus 
 Mimulus pilosus 
 Orthocarpus purpurascens 
 Pedicularis densiflora 
 Penstemon centranthifolius 
 Penstemon heterophyllus 
 Penstemon spectabilis 
 Solanaceae
 Datura innoxia (Datura)
 Nicotiana glauca 
 Nicotiana bigelovii 
 Nicotiana glauca 
 Solanum douglasii 
 Solanum xanti

 Trees
 Acer macrophyllum - (Bigleaf Maple)
 Alnus rhombifolia - (White Alder)
 Juglans californica - (California Black Walnut)
 Quercus agrifolia - (Coast Live Oak)
 Quercus chrysolepis - (Canyon Live Oak)
 Pinus sabiniana - (Digger Pine, Gray Pine)
 Platanus racemosa - (California Sycamore)
 Umbellularia Californica - (California Bay)

See also

Santa Monica Mountains National Recreation Area
California chaparral and woodlands
California coastal sage and chaparral sub-ecoregion
Coastal sage scrub plant community
California montane chaparral and woodlands sub-ecoregion
California Native Plant Society

Notes

References
 Flora of the Santa Monica Mountains - Alphabetical Checklist; UCLA Botanical Garden website lists.
 	Flora of the Santa Monica Mountains - by Family: page 1
 Flora of the Santa Monica Mountains - by Family: page 2
 Regional Flora of Santa Monica Mountains 
 Santa Monica Mountains Flora: A Check List
 Flora of Malibu Creek State Park
 Flora of Topanga State Park
 Flora of Point Mugu State Park
 Flora of Charmlee Regional Park
 Flora of Mishe Mokwa Trail Area
"Flora of the Santa Monica Mountains, California"; publication: Southern California Botanists; Peter H Raven.

Further reading
"Flora of the Santa Monica Mountains, California", Southern California Botanists; Peter H Raven. 
"Wildflowers of the Santa Monica Mountains", by Milt McAuley. 
"Flowering Plants: The Santa Monica Mountains, Coastal and Chaparral Regions of Southern California", by Nancy Dale. 
"Roadside Plants of Southern California", by Thomas J. Belzer. 
"California Native Plants for the Garden", by Carol Bornstein, David Fross, and Bart O'Brien; Cachuma Press, Los Olivos CA, 2005;  & .
 "The Jepson Manual,"  James C Hickman, UC Press,  .  
 Jepson Manual Online:  Jepson Interchange plant database

External links

Santa Monica Mountains National Recreation Area: Online Flower Finder website
Jepson Manual: online flora-plants list of the Western Transverse Ranges — includes the Santa Monica Mountains.

 01
.
Santa Monica Mountains
.
Los Angeles-related lists
California chaparral and woodlands
Simi Hills
.Santa Monica Mountains
.Santa Monica Mountains
Natural history of Los Angeles County, California
Natural history of Ventura County, California